Gian Matteo Ranzi (born 31 January 1948) is a retired Italian lightweight wrestler who won a bronze medal at the 1972 Summer Olympics in Greco-Roman wrestling. He also won two medals at the Mediterranean Games, a gold in 1975 and a silver in 1971.

References

External links
 

1948 births
Living people
Olympic wrestlers of Italy
Wrestlers at the 1972 Summer Olympics
Wrestlers at the 1976 Summer Olympics
Italian male sport wrestlers
Olympic bronze medalists for Italy
Olympic medalists in wrestling
Medalists at the 1972 Summer Olympics
Mediterranean Games gold medalists for Italy
Mediterranean Games silver medalists for Italy
Mediterranean Games medalists in wrestling
Competitors at the 1971 Mediterranean Games
Competitors at the 1975 Mediterranean Games